Zinc selenide (ZnSe) is a light-yellow, solid compound comprising zinc (Zn) and selenium (Se). ZnSe rarely occurs in nature, and is found in the mineral that was named after Hans Stille called "stilleite."

Properties
ZnSe can be made in both hexagonal (wurtzite) and cubic (zincblende) crystal structure.

It is a wide-bandgap semiconductor of the  II-VI semiconductor group (since zinc and selenium belong to the 12th and 16th groups of the periodic table, respectively). The material can be doped n-type doping with, for instance, halogen elements. P-type doping is more difficult, but can be achieved by introducing gallium.

Applications
 ZnSe is used to form II-VI light-emitting diodes and diode lasers. It emits blue light.
 ZnSe doped with chromium (ZnSe:Cr) has been used as an infrared laser gain medium emitting at about 2.4 μm.
 It is used as an infrared optical material with a remarkably wide transmission wavelength range (0.45 μm to 21.5 μm). The refractive index is about 2.67 at 550 nm (green), and about 2.40 at 10.6 μm (LWIR). Similar to zinc sulfide, ZnSe is produced as microcrystalline sheets by synthesis from hydrogen selenide gas and zinc vapour. Another method of producing is a growth from melt under excessive pressure of inert gas (Ar usually). When free of absorption and inclusions it is ideally suited for CO2 laser optics at 10.6 μm wavelength. It is thus a very important IR material. In daily life, it can be found as the entrance optic in the new range of "in-ear" clinical thermometers, seen as a small yellow window. Zinc selenide can slowly react with atmospheric moisture if poorly polished, but this is not generally a serious problem. Except where optics are used in spectroscopy or at the Brewster angle, antireflection or beamsplitting optical coatings are generally employed.
 ZnSe activated with tellurium (ZnSe(Te)) is a scintillator with emission peak at 640 nm, suitable for matching with photodiodes. It is used in x-ray and gamma ray detectors. ZnSe scintillators are significantly different from the ZnS ones.

Chemistry
ZnSe is insoluble in water, but reacts with acids to form toxic hydrogen selenide gas. 

It can be deposited as a thin film by chemical vapour deposition techniques including MOVPE and vacuum evaporation.

References

External links
II-VI - INFRARED optical data & more
University of Reading, Infrared Multilayer Laboratory optical data

selenide
Selenides
II-VI semiconductors
Optical materials
Phosphors and scintillators
Laser gain media
Zincblende crystal structure
Wurtzite structure type